Hancock Hill may refer to:

 Hancock Hill (Indiana)
 Hancock Hill (Kansas)
 Hancock Hill (Worcester County, Massachusetts), Worcester County, Massachusetts
 Hancock Hill (Norfolk County, Massachusetts), Norfolk County, Massachusetts
 Hancock Hill (Mississippi)
 Hancock Hill (Oregon)
 Hancock Hill (Texas)
 Hancock Butte (Arizona)
 Hancock Knoll (Arizona)
 Hancock Knolls (Arizona)

See also
 Mount Hancock (disambiguation), a list of various mountains